"Nobody's Wife" is the second single released from Dutch singer-songwriter Anouk's debut studio album, Together Alone (1997). The song, a rock ballad, was written by Anouk, Satindra Kalpoe, and Bart van Veen, and it was produced by George Kooymans, Barry Hay, and John Sonneveld. It was released through Dino Music in the Netherlands and Ireland, BMG in Europe and Australia, and Columbia Records in the United States.

First issued as a single in the Netherlands, "Nobody's Wife" became a hit, reaching number two on both the Dutch Top 40 and the Single Top 100 charts. In early 1998, the song began to gain popularity in the rest of mainland Europe, especially in the Flanders region of Belgium and the Nordic countries, reaching the top 10 in these regions; in Iceland, it peaked at number one for two weeks. A music video shot in black and white was made for the song, featuring clips of Anouk singing and dancing to the song.

Composition
"Nobody's Wife" is published in the key of F major with a tempo of 98 beats per minute.

Critical reception
Music & Media wrote about the song. On the 13 December 1997 issue, Dutch music programmer Ben Houdijk said of the song, "It might be loud on the
surface, but under the skin, there's a beautiful song. A rock song with balls is a gift to radio in these ballad -flooded times." Meanwhile, on the 31 January 1998 issue, Music & Media commented, "This is an excellent rock ballad by the Golden Earring endorsed Dutch debutante artist [...]. Anouk has made a bold—and as it turns out, convincing—move into the territory already occupied by the likes of Alanis Morissette and Meredith Brooks." British trade paper Music Week wrote that while the track is not "original", it appeals to both young and old rock music fans.

Chart performance
The song was first released in the Netherlands in the latter half of 1997. It first charted on the Single Top 100 chart on 20 September 1997 at number 94, then debuted on the Dutch Top 40 Tipparade chart on 4 October at number 30. On 15 November, the song rose to number two on both charts on stayed at that rank for four weeks on both listings. It remained on the Dutch Top 40 for 20 weeks and the Single Top 100 for 40 weeks, earning a platinum certification from the NVPI for shipments of over 75,000 units. According to the Single Top 100 chart, it was the ninth-best-selling hit of the year.

After its Dutch success, "Nobody's Wife" began to receive airplay throughout western and northern Europe. It made its first foreign chart appearance on the Swedish Singles Chart on 12 December 1997, climbing to a peak of number two on 16 January 1998 and keeping the position for five weeks. It ended 1998 as Sweden's 17th-most-successful song and was certified platinum for shipping over 30,000 copies. The single is also certified platinum in Norway, where it peaked at number two for three weeks. In the Flanders region of Belgium, "Nobody's Wife" reached number five on the week of 28 February and eventually went gold for sales exceeding 25,000, and in Denmark, it reached number six in late January.

In February 1998, "Nobody's Wife" charted in Finland, rising to number nine three weeks after its debut. The song then garnered success in Iceland starting in early March, debuting at number four on the Íslenski listinn chart and topping the listing on the weeks of 20 and 27 March. In the United Kingdom, the song was released on 8 June 1998 but did not chart. The same month, on 27 June, the single debuted on the French Singles Chart at number 80. It reached its peak of number 34 on 8 August and spent a total of 14 weeks in the top 100. In Italy, "Nobody's Wife" peaked at number five and stayed on the chart for nine weeks. The song was released in the United States in September 1998 but failed to make a significant impact, charting only on the Billboard Heritage Rock chart at number 32. In March 2010, the single appeared on the German Singles Chart for only one week, at number 87.

Track listings

 Dutch CD single
 "Nobody's Wife" – 3:26

 European CD single
 "Nobody's Wife" – 3:25
 "It's a Shame" – 3:26

 European maxi-CD single
 "Nobody's Wife" (US remix) – 3:25
 "Nobody's Wife" (album version) – 3:25
 "Nobody's Wife" (edited album version) – 3:18
 "It's a Shame" – 3:26

 UK and Australian CD single
 "Nobody's Wife" (radio edit) – 3:18
 "Nobody's Wife" (album version) – 3:25
 "Nobody's Wife" (instrumental) – 3:26
 "It's a Shame" – 3:26

 US 7-inch single
A. "Nobody's Wife" – 3:25
B. "Sacrifice" – 3:58

Credits and personnel
Credits are adapted from the Dutch CD single and the Together Alone album booklet.

Studio
 Recorded at Lagune Studios (Rijkevorsel, Belgium)

Personnel

 Anouk Teeuwe – writing, vocals
 Bart van Veen – writing
 Satindra Kalpoe – writing
 Lex Bolderdijk – guitar
 Michel van Schie – bass
 Hans Eijkenaar – drums
 Eddy Conard – percussion

 John Sonneveld – production, engineering
 George Kooymans – production
 Barry Hay – production
 Sander van der Heide – mastering
 Jansen & Holland B.V. – cover design
 Frans Jansen – cover photo

Charts

Weekly charts

Year-end charts

Certifications

References

1990s ballads
1997 singles
1997 songs
Anouk (singer) songs
Bertelsmann Music Group singles
Black-and-white music videos
Columbia Records singles
Number-one singles in Iceland
Rock ballads
Songs written by Anouk (singer)